"This Is My Night" is a song by Chaka Khan from the album I Feel for You. The song went to number one for one week on the Billboard dance chart in 1985. The single also peaked at #60 on the Billboard Hot 100 and #11 on the R&B chart.

"This Is My Night" was written by Mic Murphy and David Frank and produced by Arif Mardin.

A variation of the song was used by HBO as its theme music for Next On bumpers and promos from May to November 1985 (as the centerpiece of the Make the Magic Shine campaign). It also appeared on the twelfth season of the drag competition series RuPaul's Drag Race, in a "lip sync battle" between contestants Widow Von'Du and Jan, while Khan served as a guest judge.

Track listing

7" Single

12" Single

Chart positions

References

External links 

 

1984 songs
1985 singles
Chaka Khan songs
Song recordings produced by Arif Mardin
Songs written by David Frank (musician)
Songs written by Mic Murphy
Warner Records singles